Nancy Pyle is an American former Democratic Party politician from California, serving on the San Jose City Council, representing District 10 from 2005 to 2012.

Career
Pyle is a retired teacher who taught for over 25 years. Nancy was also on the Community College Board of Trustees and she represents over 100,000 residents from both the Almaden Valley and Blossom Valley.

Education
Nancy Pyle graduated from LeMoyne College in Syracuse, New York where she majored in French. She later earned her master's degree in Educational Administration from the US International University in San Diego.

Family
In 1960, Nancy and her husband Roger moved their family to San Jose where she served as a teacher, Community Relations Manager, and Legislative Analyst for the San Jose Unified School District. She has two adult children, 3 step children and 4 step grandchildren.

External links
 Nancy Pyle biography

References

California Democrats
San Jose City Council members
Le Moyne College alumni
Living people
Women city councillors in California
Year of birth missing (living people)
21st-century American women